Spathodus erythrodon is a species of cichlid endemic to Lake Tanganyika though absent from the southern end of the lake.  Preferring areas with rubble or pebble substrates, this species prefers very shallow waters usually being found in waters of less than  depth.  This species can reach a length of  TL.  It can also be found in the aquarium trade.

References

erythrodon
Taxa named by George Albert Boulenger
Fish described in 1900
Taxonomy articles created by Polbot